The following drivers competed in the NASCAR All-Star Race at Charlotte Motor Speedway (1985, 1987–2019), Atlanta Motor Speedway (1986), Bristol Motor Speedway (2020), and Texas Motor Speedway (2021-Present). In gold the drivers who won the NASCAR Cup Series championship.

References

NASCAR All-Star Race drivers
All-Star Race
All-Star Race drivers
All-Star Race drivers
All-Star Race drivers
All-Star Race drivers
NASCAR All-Star Race drivers
NASCAR All-Star Race drivers
Drivers